Goya Airport  is an airport serving Goya, a town on the Paraná River in Corrientes Province, Argentina.

North approach and departure cross over the Santa Lucía River.

The Goya non-directional beacon (Ident: G1) is located on the field.

See also

Transport in Argentina
List of airports in Argentina

References

External links

OpenStreetMap - Goya Airport
FallingRain - Goya Airport

Airports in Argentina